Colwellia mytili is a Gram-negative, rod-shaped, aerobic and motile bacterium from the genus of Colwellia which has been isolated from the mussel Mytilus edulis from the South Sea in Korea.

References

External links
Type strain of Colwellia mytili at BacDive -  the Bacterial Diversity Metadatabase

Alteromonadales
Bacteria described in 2017